Incantatio maris aestuosi ("Incantation for a Stormy Sea") is an a cappella choral composition by the Estonian composer Veljo Tormis completed in 1996. The piece was commissioned by the Swedish Orphei Drängar and Finnish YL Male Voice Choir male choirs in remembrance of the victims of the  ferry that sank on September 29, 1994. The piece is about six minutes in length.

Text 

The text of the piece is from the 18th and 42nd songs of the Finnish national epic Kalevala. The Latin translation of Kalevala from 1986 by Tuomo Pekkanen is used. Latin was chosen as the commissioning choirs conditioned that the choirs' native languages Finnish and Swedish should not be used.

Recordings 
 YL Male Voice Choir on Best of Ylioppilaskunnan Laulajat (2008)
 Cantus on There Lies the Home (2006)
  The Vocal Consort on "Incantations" (2012)

References 

MS Estonia
Choral compositions
1996 compositions